2009 Montedio Yamagata season

Competitions

Player statistics

Other pages
 J. League official site

Montedio Yamagata
Montedio Yamagata seasons